WKMG (AM 1520) was a radio station broadcasting all varieties of music from 1968 to 2011 in Newberry, SC.

The station license was last owned by Cornell Blakely. Service Radio Company, Inc. owns the property.

The station signed on May 22, 1968 with a country music format.  The license transferred from Service Radio Company, Inc. to Durst Broadcasting Company, Inc. on January 1, 1989, and from Durst to Cornell Blakely on March 20, 2001.

WKMG was deleted by the Federal Communications Commission (FCC) on December 2, 2011 for failure to file for the renewal of its license, which expired a day earlier. 

On October 4, 2017, the FCC informed WKMG that it believed the station had been silent for over a year and ordered the station to provide its full operational status since August 9, 2011; in attempting to inform WKMG on May 10, 2017 of unpaid debts it owed to the commission, FCC staffers discovered that owner Cornell Blakely had died on December 2, 2013, and that WKMG's phone number had been disconnected. After the FCC's notification was returned as undeliverable, the WKMG license was cancelled on November 9, 2017.

References

External links

Application Search Results for facility ID 17766
Correspondence Folder for facility ID 17766

KMG
Radio stations established in 1968
1968 establishments in South Carolina
Radio stations disestablished in 2017
2017 disestablishments in South Carolina
Defunct radio stations in the United States
KMG
KMG